Zaboli Mahalleh-ye Sofla (also Romanized as Zābolī Maḩalleh-ye Soflá; also known as Zābol Maḩalleh-ye Pā’īn and Zābolī Maḩalleh-ye Pā’īn) is a village in Jafarbay-ye Jonubi Rural District, in the Central District of Torkaman County, Golestan Province, Iran. At the 2006 census, its population was 354, in 84 families.

References 

Populated places in Torkaman County